Imperator Aleksandr II was a Russian  battleship built for the Imperial Russian Navy in the 1880s. She was an artillery training ship assigned to the Baltic Fleet by the time of the Russo-Japanese War of 1905 and was not sent to the Pacific as was most of the rest of the Baltic Fleet. She was inactive at Kronstadt during World War I, but her crew was active in the revolutionary movement. She was turned over to the Kronstadt port authority on 21 April 1921 before she was sold for scrap on 22 August 1922. She was towed to Germany during the autumn of 1922, but was not stricken from the Navy List until 21 November 1925.

Description
Imperator Aleksandr II was named after the Emperor Alexander II of Russia. She was built by the New Admiralty Yard at Saint Petersburg. She was laid down in June 1885, launched in July 1887, and completed in June 1891, although her trials lasted until the spring of 1892.

Imperator Aleksandr II had two three-cylinder vertical compound steam engines driving  screw propellers. Twelve cylindrical boilers provided steam to the engines.

The main armament of the Imperator Aleksandr II-class ships was a pair of  Obukhov Model 1877 30-calibre guns mounted in a twin barbette mount forward. The four  Obukhov Model 1877 35-calibre guns were on center-pivot mounts in casemates at the corners of the citadel, the hull being recessed to increase their arcs of fire ahead or behind. The eight  Model 1877 35-calibre guns were mounted on broadside pivot mounts. Four were fitted between the 9-inch guns and could traverse a total of 100°. The others were mounted at each end of the ship where they could fire directly ahead or astern. The ten  Hotchkiss revolving cannon were mounted in hull embrasures of the ship between the nine and six-inch guns to defend against torpedo boats. Four  Hotchkiss revolving cannon were mounted in each fighting top. Imperator Aleksandr II carried five above-water  torpedo tubes, two in the bow, one on each side of the stempost, one tube on each broadside and a tube in the stern. Smaller  torpedo tubes could be mounted in four of the ship's cutters. Thirty-six mines could also be carried.

History
Imperator Aleksandr II served in the Baltic Fleet and along with the cruiser  represented Russia at the opening of the Kiel Canal in Germany in June 1895. She ran aground in Vyborg Bay later that year, but sustained little damage. She joined the Mediterranean Squadron in August 1896. She deployed to Crete in February 1897 to operate as part of the International Squadron, a multinational force made up of ships of the Austro-Hungarian Navy, French Navy, Imperial German Navy, Italian Royal Navy (Regia Marina), Imperial Russian Navy, and Royal Navy that intervened in the 1897–1898 Greek uprising on Crete against rule by the Ottoman Empire.

Imperator Aleksandr II returned to Kronstadt in September 1901. She was reboilered in December 1903 and modified in 1904 to serve as an artillery school ship. Her crew refused to suppress the mutinous garrison of Fort Konstantin defending Kronstadt in August 1906. She was assigned to the Artillery Training Detachment in 1907. She spent most of World War I in Kronstadt where her crew was active in the revolutionary movement. She was renamed Zarya Svobody (Заря Свободы—Dawn of Freedom) in May 1917. She was turned over to the Kronstadt port authority on 21 April 1921 before she was sold for scrap on 22 August 1922. She was towed to Germany during the autumn of 1922, but was not stricken from the Navy List until 21 November 1925.

Conway's says that she was reconstructed in France between 1902 and 1904, with her torpedo tubes removed and her six and nine-inch guns exchanged for five  45 calibre guns and eight six-inch 45 calibre guns. Her revolving cannon were also exchanged for ten three-pounder guns. Arbazov confirms that the torpedo tubes were removed and says that she had her nine-inch guns replaced by five 8-inch, the fifth being placed at the stern, the old six-inch guns were exchanged for newer, more powerful models, and four 47-mm and four 120-mm guns were added on the upper deck, presumably replacing the old revolving cannon.

References

Bibliography

 McTiernan, Mick, A Very Bad Place Indeed For a Soldier. The British involvement in the early stages of the European Intervention in Crete. 1897–1898, King's College, London, September 2014.

Further reading
А.Б. Широкорад. Корабельная артиллерия российского флота 1867–1922 г. «Морская коллекция» № 2 за 1997 год.
Моисеев С. П. Список кораблей русского парового и броненосного флота 1861–1917 г. М., Воениздат, 1948
Чертеж ЭБР «Император Николай I». Тверь, «Ретро-Флот», 1993
Вторая тихоокеанская эскадра. «Наваль», вып. 1, с. 24–29. М., 1991
А.А. Белов «Броненосцы Японии». Серия "Боевые корабли мира"

External links
ship history Encyclopedia of Ships 
ship photo gallery

Imperator Aleksandr II-class battleships
1887 ships
Russo-Japanese War battleships of Russia